Dorothea Krag (27 September 1675–10 October 1754) was a Danish Postmaster General and noble.

Dorothea was married first to count Jens Juel in 1694, and second to the king's illegitimate half brother Christian Gyldenløve in 1701. As the widow of Count Christian Gyldenløve, the Postmaster General since 1686, she was granted the income from the office from 1703 until 1711. This was expected to be a purely formal office for her part, however she did in fact perform the duties of Postmaster, something unique for a woman of her time and the first for her country. She reformed the office of postmaster (1705), and introduced uniforms and signal horns (1709). Married thirdly to nobleman Hans Adolf Ahlefeld in 1715.

See also 
 Katharina Henot
 Hedevig Johanne Bagger

References 
 Dansk kvindebiografisk leksikon

1675 births
18th-century Danish people
18th-century Danish women landowners
18th-century Danish landowners
Postmasters-General
1754 deaths
17th-century Danish nobility
18th-century Danish nobility
Krag family
18th-century civil servants